North Bay Water Aerodrome  is located on Trout Lake, adjacent to North Bay, Ontario, Canada.

See also
 North Bay/Jack Garland Airport

References

Registered aerodromes in Ontario
Transport in North Bay, Ontario
Seaplane bases in Ontario
Airports in Nipissing District